Peer-Partner is one of the choices available to students in Student-Directed Teaching, a progressive teaching technology.

Along with Student-Teacher Contract and Self-Directed, Peer-Partner is a teaching style that requires a different level of independence from Command and Task. It is, to some extent, a self-directed teaching style that allows the student to learn in his or her own fashion.

Under Peer-Partner, the teacher will: 

Provide a unit plan consisting of the objectives for several days, written in a language that the students can understand
Visit with each student at least once each period: this provides an opportunity to assess the progress of the peer-partners
Determine the appropriateness of the style selected by each student
Use good questioning techniques and negotiation to help steer the students to becoming more independent
Provide perception checks and final tests as indicated in the unit plan
Provide a second evaluative activity if required by an individual student

The student will:

Choose a partner very carefully, considering each other's learning characteristics when making the choice
Study each objective and jointly decide how the learning will take place. Discussion is an important component of this style
Listen to the instruction the teacher is providing for the Command and Task students, if the objective is beyond the experience of both students
Consider what they know and what they don't know when selecting the amount and type of practice
Check each other's work
Declare the mark expected on each perception check
Do more than one perception check if the declared mark is not within the flexibility factor
Prepare a plan which will indicate how they are going to use their Earned Time.

References

Educational technology
Peer learning